Michael Smyth may refer to:

 Michael Smyth (journalist),  Australian journalist and broadcaster
 Michael Smyth (politician) (died 1973), Irish politician
 Mickey Smyth (1921–1981), Irish trade unionist and politician

See also
 Michael Smith (disambiguation)